The 1970 New York City Marathon was the 1st edition of the New York City Marathon and took place in New York City on 13 September.

Results

Men

References

External links

New York City
Marathon
New York City Marathon
New York City Marathon